North Tonawanda City School District is a public school district that covers North Tonawanda, New York.  The school district consists of 3,371 students (2017) in grades PreK-12 (One PreK center, three K-3 elementary schools, one 4-6 intermediate school, one 7-8 middle school, and one 9-12 high school).

Gregory J. Woytila, Superintendent

Schools

PreK
Ohio (operated by Carousel Academy)

Elementary (K-3)
Drake Elementary School - Principal: Janet Matyevich 
Ohio Elementary School - Principal: John Steckstor 
Spruce Elementary School - Principal: Patricia Adler

Former
Gilmore Elementary School - Opened in 1925, closed on June 22, 2012. Principal: Vicki Pohlman 2010-2012

Intermediate (4-6)
North Tonawanda Intermediate School 
Gregory Burgess, Principal.
Rachel Wagner, Assistant Principal.

Middle (7-8)
North Tonawanda Middle School (Formerly Dr. Thaddeus F. Reszel Middle School)
Principal; Joshua Janese.
Assistant Principal: Scott Mueller.

Former
George L. Lowry Middle School - Built in 1925, opened in 1926, and closed on June 30, 2004.

Principal: Gregory Burgess.
Assistant Principal: Scott Mueller. 
Former
Wendy Richards - Principal 2007-2009 (Named principal of Ohio Elementary, Resigned)

High (9-12)
North Tonawanda High School
Bradley Rowles, Principal.
Joseph M. Pray, Assistant Principal 
Rachel Ross, Assistant Principal.
Jacquelyn Coyle, Assistant Principal/Attendance.

External links
School District Webpage

Bird's Eye Images
Grant School
Drake Elementary School
Meadow Elementary School
Ohio Elementary School
Spruce Elementary School
North Tonawanda Middle School
North Tonawanda High School

School districts in New York (state)
Education in Niagara County, New York
North Tonawanda, New York